The name Luis has been used for five tropical cyclones worldwide, one in the Atlantic Ocean and four in the Philippines by PAGASA in the Western Pacific Ocean.

In the Atlantic:
 Hurricane Luis (1995) – a Category 4 hurricane which killed 16 in the Leeward Islands and one in Newfoundland and Labrador.

The name Luis was retired following the 1995 hurricane season and was replaced by Lorenzo.

In the Western Pacific:
 Typhoon Shanshan (2006) (T0613, 14W, Luis) – a strong typhoon which struck Japan
 Typhoon Kalmaegi (2014) (T1415, 15W, Luis) – a minimal typhoon which struck the Philippines
 Tropical Depression 24W (2018) (24W, Luis) – a weak tropical depression which struck Taiwan
 Typhoon Roke (2022) (T2218, 20W, Luis) – a minimal typhoon that did not threaten any land areas 

Atlantic hurricane set index articles
Pacific typhoon set index articles